Pınarlar is a village in the Pertek District, Tunceli Province, Turkey. The village is populated by Kurds of the Bermaz tribe and had a population of 321 in 2021.

The hamlets of Adıgüzel, Göztepe and Taşbalta are attached to the village.

References 

Kurdish settlements in Tunceli Province
Villages in Pertek District